Qaleh-ye Jahan Bakhsh (also Romanized as Qal‘eh-ye Jahān Bakhsh and Qal‘eh Jahānbakhsh; also known as Qal‘eh-ye Jahān and Jahānbakhsh) is a village in Zagheh Rural District, Zagheh District, Khorramabad County, Lorestan Province, Iran. At the 2006 census, its population was 124, in 27 families.

References 

Towns and villages in Khorramabad County